Russkikh is a surname. Notable people with the surname include:

 Aleksandr Russkikh (born 1983), Russian footballer
 Anastasia Russkikh (born 1983), Russian badminton player
 Natalia Russkikh (born 1985), Russian footballer

See also
 

Russian-language surnames